Abdul Rahman Noorani was a citizen of Afghanistan who was held in extrajudicial detention in the United States Guantanamo Bay detainment camps, in Cuba.
His Internment Serial Number was 582.

He was repatriated on July 16, 2003.

Claims he "returned to the fight"

The Defense Intelligence Agency would later assert that during an Al Jazeera interview from October 7, 2001, he was identified as the “deputy defense minister of the Taliban.”
The DIA would also identify him as a "former Guantanamo captive who returned to the fight":

References

Guantanamo detainees known to have been released
Year of birth missing (living people)
Living people
Afghan extrajudicial prisoners of the United States